Anglia Railways was a train operating company in England, owned by GB Railways and later FirstGroup, that operated the Anglia franchise from January 1997 until March 2004.

History
The InterCity Anglia franchise was awarded by the Director of Passenger Rail Franchising to GB Railways with the franchise commencing on 5 January 1997. In June 1998, Anglia Railways unveiled a turquoise and white livery. Prior to 1997 the trains were run by British Rail sectors of  InterCity, Regional Railways and Network SouthEast. After March 2004 the trains were run by National Express East Anglia.

Services
Anglia Railways operated InterCity services on the Great Eastern Main Line from London Liverpool Street to Harwich International and Norwich. It also operated regional services between Ipswich & Felixstowe, Ipswich & Lowestoft, Ipswich & Ely, Harwich International / Ipswich & Cambridge, Ely & Peterborough, Norwich & Ely, Norwich & Sheringham, Norwich & Great Yarmouth and Norwich & Lowestoft.

A franchise commitment was to increase the hourly London Liverpool Street and Norwich services to half-hourly. The half-hourly service was introduced in 2000 with some extended to Sheringham, Great Yarmouth and Lowestoft.

With funding from the Strategic Rail Authority's Rail Partnership Funding, Anglia introduced a new experimental service from the Great Eastern Main Line via the North London Line to Basingstoke branded London Crosslink. It operated from 22 May 2000 until ceasing on 28 September 2002 due to poor loadings.

A more successful new service with Rail Partnership Funding was introduced on 29 September 2002 from Norwich to Cambridge. This continues to operate.

Rolling stock
Anglia Railways inherited a fleet of Class 86s, Mark 2 carriages, Driving Brake Standard Opens, Class 150s and Class 153s from British Rail. As part of the franchise, the fleet of Mark 2 carriages had a complete mechanical and interior refurbishment. On 10 June 1998, it unveiled its turquoise and white livery. In June 1998, preserved Class 201 unit 1001 commenced an eleven-month lease operating services from Norwich to Great Yarmouth and Lowestoft.

To meet a franchise commitment to operate two services per hour between London Liverpool Street and Norwich, eight three-car Class 170 Turbostar units were delivered in 1999/2000. These units were used on new services from Liverpool Street to Sheringham, Great Yarmouth and Lowestoft, and on London Crosslink services, as well as being hired to GB Railways' Hull Trains subsidiary to work services between London King's Cross and Hull from September 2000. Due to late delivery of these units, Class 317s and Class 322s were hired from West Anglia Great Northern for a time. A further four two-car Class 170s were delivered in 2002, and were principally used on the new Norwich to Cambridge services.

Anglia hired a Class 47 from Cotswold Rail from June 2002 as a rescue locomotive and to haul Mark 2 sets on summer Saturday services to Great Yarmouth.

In July 2002, Anglia hired a Class 90 from Freightliner for a few months with a view to replacing the Class 86s. In October 2003, Anglia began operating three Class 90s from English, Welsh & Scottish Railway until the end of the franchise.

Depot

Anglia Railway's fleet was maintained at Crown Point TMD.

Demise
In 2002, as part of a franchise reorganisation by the Strategic Rail Authority, it was announced that the Anglia Railways franchise would be merged into the Greater Anglia franchise. Having missed out on pre-qualifying for the Greater Anglia franchise, FirstGroup purchased GB Railways in August 2003.

In December 2003, the Strategic Rail Authority awarded the Greater Anglia franchise to National Express with the services operated by Anglia Railways transferring to One on 1 April 2004.

References

External links

Company website

Defunct train operating companies
FirstGroup railway companies
Railway companies established in 1997
Railway companies disestablished in 2004
1997 establishments in England
2004 disestablishments in England
British companies disestablished in 2004
British companies established in 1997